Bridge in Reed Township, originally known as Wiconisco Canal Aqueduct No. 3, is a historic multi-span stone arch bridge spanning Powell Creek on State Route 147 (River Road) in Reed Township, Dauphin County, Pennsylvania. It was built in 1840, as an aqueduct. It is built of red and white coursed ashlar and features a belt course and continuous parapet cap.

It was added to the National Register of Historic Places in 1988.

See also
List of bridges documented by the Historic American Engineering Record in Pennsylvania

References

External links

Road bridges on the National Register of Historic Places in Pennsylvania
Bridges completed in 1840
Bridges in Dauphin County, Pennsylvania
Historic American Engineering Record in Pennsylvania
National Register of Historic Places in Dauphin County, Pennsylvania
Stone arch bridges in the United States